Rexhep Memini (born 4 October 1994) is an Albanian professional footballer.

References

1994 births
Living people
Footballers from Durrës
Albanian footballers
Association football defenders
Albania youth international footballers
KF Teuta Durrës players
SK Tepelena players
FK Sukhti players
FK Kukësi players
KF Trepça'89 players
Besa Kavajë players
Kategoria Superiore players
Football Superleague of Kosovo players
Albanian expatriate footballers
Expatriate footballers in Kosovo
Albanian expatriate sportspeople in Kosovo